Cecilia Payne-Gaposchkin (born Cecilia Helena Payne;  – ) was a British-born American astronomer and astrophysicist who proposed in her 1925 doctoral thesis that stars were composed primarily of hydrogen and helium. Her groundbreaking conclusion was initially rejected because it contradicted the scientific wisdom of the time, which held that there were no significant elemental differences between the Sun and Earth. Independent observations eventually proved she was correct. Her work on the nature of variable stars was foundational to modern astrophysics.

Early life
Cecilia Helena Payne was one of three children born in Wendover in Buckinghamshire, England, to Emma Leonora Helena (née Pertz) and Edward John Payne, a London barrister, historian and musician who had been an Oxford fellow. Her mother came from a Prussian family and had two distinguished uncles, historian Georg Heinrich Pertz and the Swedenborgian writer James John Garth Wilkinson; her sister Florence was a pianist. Cecilia Payne's father died when she was four years old, forcing her mother to raise the family on her own.

Cecilia Payne began school in Wendover at a private school run by Elizabeth Edwards. When she was twelve her mother moved to London for the sake of the education of Cecilia's brother Humfry, who later became an archaeologist. Cecilia attended St Mary's College, Paddington, where she was unable to study much mathematics or science, but in 1918 changed schools for St Paul's Girls' School. There she was urged by Gustav Holst, who taught music at the school, to pursue a career in music, but she preferred to focus on science. The following year she won a scholarship that paid all her expenses at Newnham College, Cambridge University, where she initially read botany, physics, and chemistry but she dropped botany after her first year. 

Her interest in astronomy began after she attended a lecture by Arthur Eddington on his 1919 expedition to the island of Príncipe in the Gulf of Guinea off the west coast of Africa to observe and photograph the stars near a solar eclipse as a test of Albert Einstein's general theory of relativity. She said of the lecture: "The result was a complete transformation of my world picture. [...] My world had been so shaken that I experienced something very like a nervous breakdown." She completed her studies, but was not awarded a degree because of her sex; Cambridge did not grant degrees to women until 1948.

Payne realized that her only career option in the U.K. was to become a teacher, so she looked for grants that would enable her to move to the United States. After being introduced to Harlow Shapley, the Director of the Harvard College Observatory, where he had just established a graduate program in astronomy, she left England in 1923. This was made possible by a fellowship to encourage women to study at the observatory. Adelaide Ames had become the first student on the fellowship in 1922; the second was Payne. She was described by Lawrence H. Aller as one of the "most capable go-getters" in Shapley's group.

Doctoral thesis
Shapley persuaded Payne to write a doctoral dissertation, and so in 1925 she became the first person to earn a PhD in astronomy from Radcliffe College of Harvard University. Her thesis title was Stellar Atmospheres; A Contribution to the Observational Study of High Temperature in the Reversing Layers of Stars.

Payne was able to accurately relate the spectral classes of stars to their actual temperatures by applying the ionization theory developed by Indian physicist Meghnad Saha. She showed that the great variation in stellar absorption lines was due to differing amounts of ionization at different temperatures, not to different amounts of elements. She found that silicon, carbon, and other common metals seen in the Sun's spectrum were present in about the same relative amounts as on Earth, in agreement with the accepted belief of the time, which held that the stars had approximately the same elemental composition as the Earth. However, she found that helium and particularly hydrogen were vastly more abundant (for hydrogen, by a factor of about one million). Her thesis concluded that hydrogen was the overwhelming constituent of stars (see Metallicity), making it the most abundant element in the Universe.

However, when Payne's dissertation was reviewed, astronomer Henry Norris Russell, who stood by the theories of American physicist Henry Rowland, dissuaded her from concluding that the composition of the Sun was predominantly hydrogen because it would contradict the current scientific consensus that the elemental composition of the Sun and the Earth were similar. In 1914, he had written in an academic article:
The agreement of the solar and terrestrial lists is such as to confirm very strongly Rowland's opinion that, if the Earth's crust should be raised to the temperature of the Sun's atmosphere, it would give a very similar absorption spectrum. The spectra of the Sun and other stars were similar, so it appeared that the relative abundance of elements in the universe was like that in Earth's crust.

Payne consequently described her results as "spurious". A few years later, astronomer Otto Struve described her work as "the most brilliant PhD thesis ever written in astronomy". Russell also realized she was correct when he derived the same results by different means. In 1929, he published his findings in a paper that briefly acknowledged Payne's earlier work and discovery, including the mention that "[t]he most important previous determination of the abundance of the elements by astrophysical means is that by Miss Payne [...]". Nevertheless, he was generally credited for the conclusions she reached.

Career

After her doctorate, Payne studied stars of high luminosity to understand the structure of the Milky Way. Later she surveyed all stars brighter than the tenth magnitude. She then studied variable stars, making over 1,250,000 observations with her assistants. This work later was extended to the Magellanic Clouds, adding a further 2,000,000 observations of variable stars. These data were used to determine the paths of stellar evolution. She published her conclusions in her second book, The Stars of High Luminosity (1930). Her observations and analysis of variable stars, carried out with her husband, Sergei Gaposchkin, laid the basis for all subsequent work on such objects.

Payne-Gaposchkin remained scientifically active throughout her life, spending her entire academic career at Harvard. When she began, women were barred from becoming professors at Harvard, so she spent years doing less prestigious, low-paid research jobs. Nevertheless, her work resulted in several published books, including The Stars of High Luminosity (1930), Variable Stars (1938) and Variable Stars and Galactic Structure (1954). Shapley had made efforts to improve her position, and in 1938 she was given the title of "Astronomer." On Payne's request, her title was later changed to Phillips Astronomer, an endowed position which would make her an "officer of the university"; in order to get approval for her title, Shapley assured the university that giving Payne-Gaposchkin this position would not make her equivalent to a professor, but privately pushed for the position to be later converted into an explicit professorship as the "Phillips Professor of Astronomy". She was elected a Fellow of the American Academy of Arts and Sciences in 1943. Her courses were not recorded in the Harvard University catalogue until 1945.

When Donald Menzel became Director of the Harvard College Observatory in 1954, he tried to improve her appointment, and in 1956 she became the first woman to be promoted to full professor from within the faculty at Harvard's Faculty of Arts and Sciences. She was appointed the Phillips Professor of Astronomy in 1958. Later, with her appointment to the Chair of the Department of Astronomy, she also became the first woman to head a department at Harvard.[14]

Her students included Helen Sawyer Hogg, Joseph Ashbrook, Frank Drake, Harlan Smith and Paul W. Hodge, all of whom made important contributions to astronomy. She also supervised Frank Kameny and Owen Gingerich.

Payne-Gaposchkin retired from active teaching in 1966 and was subsequently appointed Professor Emerita of Harvard. She continued her research as a member of staff at the Smithsonian Astrophysical Observatory, as well as editing the journals and books published by Harvard Observatory for twenty years. She edited and published the lectures of Walter Baade as Evolution of Stars and Galaxies (1963).

Legacy
Payne's career marked a turning point at Harvard College Observatory. Under the direction of Harlow Shapley and Dr E. J. Sheridan (whom Payne-Gaposchkin described as a mentor), the observatory had already offered more opportunities in astronomy to women than did other institutions. This was evident in the achievements accomplished earlier in the century by Williamina Fleming, Antonia Maury, Annie Jump Cannon, and Henrietta Swan Leavitt. However, with Payne's PhD, women entered the mainstream.

The trail she blazed into the largely male-dominated scientific community was an inspiration to many. For example, she became a role model for astrophysicist Joan Feynman. Feynman's mother and grandmother had dissuaded her from pursuing science, since they believed women were not physically capable of understanding scientific concepts. Feynman was inspired by Payne-Gaposchkin when she came across her work in an astronomy textbook. Seeing Payne-Gaposchkin's published research convinced Feynman that she could, in fact, follow her scientific passions.

While accepting the Henry Norris Russell Prize from the American Astronomical Society, Payne spoke of her lifelong passion for research: "The reward of the young scientist is the emotional thrill of being the first person in the history of the world to see something or understand something. Nothing can compare with that experience [...] The reward of the old scientist is the sense of having seen a vague sketch grow into a masterly landscape."

Personal life
In her autobiography, Payne tells that while in school she created an experiment on the efficacy of prayer by dividing her exams in two groups, praying for success only on one, the other one being a control group. She achieved the higher marks in the latter group. Later on, she became an agnostic.

In 1931, Payne became a United States citizen. On a tour through Europe in 1933, she met Russian-born astrophysicist Sergei I. Gaposchkin in Germany. She helped him get a visa to the United States, and they married in March 1934, settling in the historic town of Lexington, Massachusetts, a short commute from Harvard. Payne added her husband's name to her own, and the Payne-Gaposchkins had three children: Edward, Katherine and Peter. Payne's daughter remembers her as "an inspired seamstress, an inventive knitter, and a voracious reader". Payne and her family were members of the First Unitarian Church in Lexington, where Cecilia taught Sunday school. 
She was also active with the Quakers. She died at her home in Cambridge, Massachusetts, on December 7, 1979, aged 79. 
Shortly before her death, Payne had her autobiography privately printed as The Dyer's Hand. It was later reprinted as Cecilia Payne-Gaposchkin: An Autobiography and Other Recollections.

Payne's younger brother, Humfry Payne (1902–1936), who married author and film critic Dilys Powell, became director of the British School of Archaeology at Athens, where he died in 1936, aged 34. Payne's granddaughter Cecilia Gaposchkin is a professor of late medieval cultural history and French history at Dartmouth College.

Honors and awards

 Elected member of Royal Astronomical Society while still a student at Cambridge 1923
 Became one of 250 scientists added to the 4th edition of American Men of Science (1927)
 Annie J. Cannon Award in Astronomy (1934) – first recipient
 Member of the American Philosophical Society (1936)
 Member of the American Academy of Arts and Sciences (1943)
Award of Merit from Radcliffe College (1952)
Rittenhouse Medal from the Rittenhouse Astronomical Society at the Franklin Institute (1961)
 Professor Emerita of Harvard University (1967)
 Henry Norris Russell Lectureship of the American Astronomical Society (1976)
The American Physical Society's Doctoral Dissertation Award in Astrophysics renamed the Cecilia Payne-Gaposchkin Doctoral Dissertation Award in Astrophysics (2018)
 Honorary Degrees from Rutgers University, Wilson College, Smith College, Western College, Colby College, and the Women's Medical College of Pennsylvania
 Asteroid 2039 Payne-Gaposchkin named after her
 The Payne-Gaposchkin Patera (volcano) on Venus is named after her.
 One of the ASAS-SN telescopes deployed in South Africa was named after her.
 Institute of Physics Cecilia Payne-Gaposchkin Medal and Prize named in her honor in 2008.

Selected bibliography
Published academic books:
 The Stars of High Luminosity (1930)
 Variable Stars (1938)
 Variable Stars and Galactic Structure (1954)
 Introduction to Astronomy (1954)
 The Galactic Novae (1957)

Significant research papers:

See also 
 Harvard Computers, a number of women working as skilled workers to process astronomical data at Harvard Observatory under the direction of Edward Charles Pickering (1877 to 1919) 
 "Sisters of the Sun", eighth episode of Cosmos: A Spacetime Odyssey, 2014 American science documentary television series
 Timeline of women in science

References

Further reading
Chapman, Emma (December 20, 2020). "The life-changing and long-lasting influence of Cecilia Payne-Gaposchkin" BBC Science Focus Magazine

Moore, Donovan (2020) What Stars Are Made Of: The Life of Cecilia Payne-Gaposchkin. Harvard U. Press  

Bretislav Friedrich. "Cecilia Payne-Gaposchkin (1900-1979)."

Obituaries

External links

 Oral history interview transcript with Cecilia Payne-Gaposchkin on 5 March 1968, American Institute of Physics, Niels Bohr Library & Archives - interview conducted by Owen Gingerich at Harvard College Observatory
 
 Biography from Goodsell Observatory
 Bibliography from the Astronomical Society of the Pacific
 Chercheuses d’étoiles, an episode about Cecilia Payne as part of Le Monde's series on women in science (in French)

American women astronomers
20th-century British astronomers
American astrophysicists
British astrophysicists
1900 births
1979 deaths
People educated at St Paul's Girls' School
Alumni of Newnham College, Cambridge
Radcliffe College alumni
Harvard University faculty
American agnostics
American Unitarians
Fellows of the American Academy of Arts and Sciences
Recipients of the Annie J. Cannon Award in Astronomy
People from Wendover
People from Lexington, Massachusetts
British emigrants to the United States
20th-century British women scientists
20th-century American scientists
20th-century American women scientists
British people of Prussian descent
Harvard College Observatory people
American women academics
American women physicists
Women astrophysicists
Women planetary scientists